Lbs. is a 2004 American comedy-drama film directed by Matthew Bonifacio and starring Carmine Famiglietti.

Cast
Carmine Famiglietti
Michael Aronov
Miriam Shor
Sharon Angela
Lou Martini Jr.
Susan Varon
Fil Formicola

Reception
The film has an 82% rating on Rotten Tomatoes.  Diego Semerene of Slant Magazine awarded the film one and a half stars out of four.  Wesley Morris of The Boston Globe awarded the film two and a half stars out of four.

The Hollywood Reporter/Associated Press gave the film a positive review and wrote, "Lbs. addresses its all-too-relevant topic with subtlety, sensitivity and welcome doses of humor."

Nomination
The film was nominated for the Independent Spirit John Cassavetes Award at the 26th Independent Spirit Awards.

References

External links
 
 

American comedy-drama films
2000s English-language films
2000s American films